Werner Sombart (19 January 1863 – 18 May 1941) was a German economist, historian and sociologist the head of the "Youngest Historical School" and one of the leading Continental European social scientists during the first quarter of the 20th century. The term late capitalism is accredited to him. The concept of creative destruction associated with capitalism is also of his coinage. His magnum opus was Der moderne Kapitalismus. It was published in 3 volumes from 1902 through 1927. In Kapitalismus he described four stages in the development of capitalism from its earliest iteration as it evolved out of feudalism, which he called proto-capitalism to early, high and, finally, late capitalism —Spätkapitalismus— in the post World War I period.

Life and work

Early career, socialism and economics
Werner Sombart was born in Ermsleben, Harz, the son of a wealthy liberal politician, industrialist, and estate-owner, Anton Ludwig Sombart. He studied law and economics at the universities of Pisa, Berlin, and Rome. In 1888, he received his Ph.D. from Berlin under the direction of Gustav von Schmoller and Adolph Wagner, then the most eminent German economists.

As an economist and especially as a social activist, Sombart was then seen as radically left-wing, and so only received — after some practical work as head lawyer of the Bremen Chamber of Commerce — a junior professorship at the out-of-the-way University of Breslau. Although faculties at such eminent universities as Heidelberg and Freiburg called him to chairs, the respective governments always vetoed this. Sombart, at that time, was an important Marxian, someone who used and interpreted Karl Marx — to the point that Friedrich Engels said he was the only German professor who understood Das Kapital. Sombart called himself a "convinced Marxist," but later wrote that "It had to be admitted in the end that Marx had made mistakes on many points of importance."

As one of the German academics concerned with contemporary social policy, Sombart also joined the Verein für Socialpolitik (Social Policy Association) around 1888, together with his friend and colleague Max Weber. This was then a new professional association of German economists affiliated with the historical school, who saw the role of economics primarily as finding solutions to the social problems of the age and who pioneered large scale statistical studies of economic issues.

Sombart was not the first sociologist to devote an entire book to the concept of social movement as he did in his Sozialismus und soziale Bewegung, published in 1896. His understanding of social movements was inspired by Marx and by a book on social movements by Lorenz von Stein. For him, the rising worker’s movement was a result of the inherent contradictions of capitalism. The proletarian situation created a “love for the masses”, which, together with the tendency “to a communistic way of life” in social production, was a prime feature of the social movement.

Sombart's magnum opus, Der moderne Kapitalismus (Historisch-systematische Darstellung des gesamteuropäischen Wirtschaftslebens von seinen Anfängen bis zur Gegenwart)  is a systematic history of economics and economic development through the centuries and very much a work of the Historical School. The development of capitalism is divided into three stages. The first volume of Der moderne Kapitalismus published in 1902, deals with proto-capitalism, the origins and transition to capitalism from feudal society, and the period he called early capitalism —Frühkapitalismus— which ended before the industrial revolution. In his second volume, which he published in 1916, he described the period that began c. 1760, as high capitalism —Hochkapitalismus. The last book, published in 1927, treats conditions in the 20th century. He called this stage late capitalism —Spätkapitalismus, which began with World War I. The three volumes were split into semi-volumes which totaled six books.

Although later much disparaged by neo-classical economists, and much criticized in specific points, Der moderne Kapitalismus is still today a standard work with important ramifications for, e.g., the Annales school (Fernand Braudel). His work was criticised by Rosa Luxemburg, who attributed to it "the express intention of driving a wedge between the trade unions and the social democracy in Germany, and of enticing the trade unions over to the bourgeois position."

In 1903 Sombart accepted a position as associate editor of the Archives for Social Science and Social Welfare, where he worked with his colleagues Edgar Jaffé and Max Weber.

In 1906, Sombart accepted a call to a full professorship at the Berlin School of Commerce, an inferior institution to Breslau but closer to political “action” than Breslau. Here, inter alia, companion volumes to Modern Capitalism dealing with luxury, fashion, and war as economic paradigms appeared; the former two were the key works on the subject until now. Also in 1906 his Why is there no Socialism in the United States? appeared. The book is a famous work on American exceptionalism in this respect to this day.

Sombart's 1911 book, Die Juden und das Wirtschaftsleben (The Jews and Modern Capitalism), is an addition to Max Weber's historic study of the connection between Protestantism (especially Calvinism) and Capitalism, with Sombart documenting Jewish involvement in historic capitalist development. He argued that Jewish traders and manufacturers, excluded from the guilds, developed a distinctive antipathy to the fundamentals of medieval commerce, which they saw as primitive and unprogressive: the desire for 'just' (and fixed) wages and prices; for an equitable system in which shares of the market were agreed and unchanging; profits and livelihoods modest but guaranteed; and limits placed on production.  Excluded from the system, Sombart argued, the Jews broke it up and replaced it with modern capitalism, in which competition was unlimited and the only law was pleasing the customer.  Paul Johnson, who considers the work "a remarkable book", notes that Sombart left out some inconvenient truths, and ignored the powerful mystical elements of Judaism. Sombart refused to recognize, as Weber did, that wherever these religious systems, including Judaism, were at their most powerful and authoritarian, commerce did not flourish.  Jewish businessmen, like Calvinist ones, tended to operate most successfully when they had left their traditional religious environment and moved on to fresher pastures.

In his somewhat eclectic 1913 book Der Bourgeois (translated as The quintessence of capitalism), Sombart endeavoured to provide a psychological and sociological portrait of the modern businessman, and to explain the origins of the capitalist spirit. The book begins with "the greed for gold", the roots of private enterprise, and the types of entrepreneurs. Subsequent chapters discuss "the middle class outlook" and various factors shaping the capitalist spirit - national psychology, racial factors, biological factors, religion, migrations, technology, and "the influence of capitalism itself."<ref>Werner Sombart, The quintessence of capitalism: a study of the history and psychology of the modern businessman. New York: Howard Fertig, 1967.</ref>

In a work published in 1915, a "war book" with the title Händler und Helden Sombart welcomed the "German War" as the "inevitable conflict between the English commercial civilisation and the heroic culture of Germany". In this book, according to Friedrich Hayek, Sombart revealed an unlimited contempt for the "commercial views of the English people" who had lost all warlike instincts, as well as contempt for "the universal striving for the happiness of the individual". To Sombart, in this work, the highest ideal is the "German idea of the State. As formulated by Fichte, Lassalle, and Rodbertus, the state is neither founded nor formed by individuals, nor an aggregate of individuals, nor is its purpose to serve any interests of individuals. It is a 'Volksgemeinschaft' (people's community) in which the individual has no rights but only duties. Claims of the individual are always an outcome of the commercial spirit. The 'ideas of 1789' – Liberty, Equality, and Fraternity – are characteristically commercial ideals which have no other purpose but to secure certain advantages to individuals." Sombart further claims that the war had helped the Germans to rediscover their "glorious heroic past as a warrior people"; that all economic activities are subordinated to military ends; and that to regard war as inhuman and senseless is a product of commercial views. There is a life higher than the individual life, the life of the people and the life of the state, and it is the purpose of the individual to sacrifice himself for that higher life. War against England was therefore also a war against the opposite ideal – the "commercial ideal of individual freedom".

Middle career and sociology
At last, in 1917, Sombart became professor at the Friedrich-Wilhelms-Universität, succeeding his mentor Adolph Wagner. He remained on the chair until 1931 but continued teaching until 1940. During that period he was also one of the most renowned sociologists alive, more prominent a contemporary than even his friend Max Weber. Sombart's insistence on Sociology as a part of the Humanities (Geisteswissenschaften) — necessarily so because it dealt with human beings and therefore required inside, empathic "Verstehen" rather than the outside, objectivizing "Begreifen" (both German words translate as "understanding" into English) — became extremely unpopular already during his lifetime. It was seen as the opposite of the "scientification" of the social sciences, in the tradition of Auguste Comte, Émile Durkheim, and Max Weber — (although this is a misunderstanding since Weber largely shared Sombart's views in these matters) — which became fashionable during this time and has more or less remained so until today. However, because Sombart's approach has much in common with Hans-Georg Gadamer's Hermeneutics, which likewise is a Verstehen-based approach to understanding the world, he is coming back in some sociological and even philosophical circles that are sympathetic to that approach and critical towards the scientification of the world. Sombart's key sociological essays are collected in his posthumous 1956 work, Noo-Soziologie.

Late career and Nazism
During the Weimar Republic, Sombart moved toward nationalism, and his relation to Nazism is still debated today.

In 1934 he published Deutscher Sozialismus where he claimed a "new spirit" was beginning to "rule mankind". The age of capitalism and proletarian socialism was over, with "German socialism" (National-Socialism) taking over. This German socialism puts the "welfare of the whole above the welfare of the individual". German socialism must effect a "total ordering of life" with a "planned economy in accordance with state regulations". The new legal system will confer on individuals "no rights but only duties" and that "the state should never evaluate individual persons as such, but only the group which represents these persons". German socialism is accompanied by the Volksgeist (national spirit) which is not racial in the biological sense but metaphysical: "the German spirit in a Negro is quite as much within the realm of possibility as the Negro spirit in a German". The antithesis of the German spirit is the Jewish spirit, which is not a matter of being born Jewish or believing in Judaism but is a capitalistic spirit. The English people possess the Jewish spirit and the "chief task" of the German people and National Socialism is to destroy the Jewish spirit.

However, his 1938 anthropology book, Vom Menschen, is clearly anti-Nazi, and was indeed hindered in publication and distribution by the Nazis. In his attitude towards the Nazis, he is often likened to Martin Heidegger as well as his younger friend and colleague Carl Schmitt, but it is clear that, while the latter two tried to be the vanguard thinkers for the Third Reich in their field and only became critical when they were too individualistic and elbowed out from their power positions, Sombart was always much more ambivalent. Sombart had many, indeed more than the typical proportion, of Jewish students, most of whom felt moderately positive about him after the war, although he clearly was no hero nor resistance fighter.

One of Sombart's daughters, Clara, was married to Hans Gerhard Creutzfeldt, who first described the Creutzfeldt–Jakob disease.

Legacy
Sombart's legacy today is difficult to ascertain, because the alleged National Socialist affiliations have made an objective reevaluation difficult (while his earlier socialist ones harmed him with the more bourgeois circles), especially in Germany. As has been stated, in economic history, his "Modern Capitalism" is regarded as a milestone and inspiration, although many details have been questioned. Key insights from his economic work concern the - recently again validated - discovery of the emergence of double-entry accounting as a key precondition for Capitalism and the interdisciplinary study of the City in the sense of urban studies. Like Weber, Sombart makes double-entry bookkeeping system an important component of modern capitalism. He wrote in "Medieval and Modern Commercial Enterprise" that "The very concept of capital is derived from this way of looking at things; one can say that capital, as a category, did not exist before double-entry bookkeeping. Capital can be defined as that amount of wealth which is used in making profits and which enters into the accounts." He also coined the term and concept of creative destruction which is a key ingredient of Joseph Schumpeter's theory of innovation (Schumpeter actually borrowed heavily from Sombart, not always with proper reference to the original work by Sombart).http://www.stephenhicks.org/wp-content/uploads/2014/02/reinert-nietzsche-creative-destruction-in-economics.pdf  In sociology, mainstream proponents still regard Sombart as a 'minor figure' and his sociological theory an oddity; today it is more philosophical sociologists and culturologists who, together with heterodox economists, use his work. Sombart has always been very popular in Japan. 

One of the reasons of a lack of reception in the United States is that most of his works were for a long time not translated into English - in spite of, and excluding, as far as the reception is concerned, the classic study on Why there is no Socialism in America.

However, in recent years sociologists have shown renewed interest in Sombart's work.

Bibliography
Sombart, Werner (1905) [1896]: Sozialismus und soziale Bewegung. Jena: Verlag von Gustav Fischer. English translation: Socialism and the Social Movement in the 19th Century, New York: G.P. Putnam’s Sons, 1898.
Sombart, Werner (1909) [1903]: Die deutsche Volkswirtschaft im neunzehnten Jahrhundert. Berlin: G. Bondi.
Sombart, Werner (1906):  Das Proletariat. Bilder und Studien. Die Gesellschaft, vol. 1. Berlin: Rütten & Loening.
Sombart, Werner (1906):  Warum gibt es in den Vereinigten Staaten keinen Sozialismus? Tübingen: Mohr.  Several English translations, incl. (1976): Why is there No Socialism in the United States? New York: Sharpe.
Sombart, Werner (1911):  Die Juden und das Wirtschaftsleben. Leipzig: Duncker. Translated into English:  The Jews and Modern Capitalism., Batoche Books, Kitchener, 2001.
Sombart, Werner: Der moderne Kapitalismus. Historisch-systematische Darstellung des gesamteuropäischen Wirtschaftslebens von seinen Anfängen bis zur Gegenwart. Final edn. 1928, repr. 1969, paperback edn. (3 vols. in 6): 1987 Munich: dtv.  (Also in Spanish; no English translation yet.)
Sombart, Werner (1913):   Krieg und Kapitalismus. München: Duncker & Humblot, 1913.
Sombart, Werner (1913):  Der Bourgeois. München und Leipzig: Duncker & Humblot, 1913.
Sombart, Werner (1913):  Luxus und Kapitalismus. München: Duncker & Humblot, 1922.  English translation: Luxury and capitalism. Ann Arbor: University of Michigan Press.
Sombart, Werner (1915):  Händler und Helden. München: Duncker & Humblot. 1915.
Sombart, Werner (1934):  Deutscher Sozialismus. Charlottenburg: Buchholz & Weisswange.  English translation (1937, 1969): A New Social Philosophy. New York: Greenwood.
Sombart, Werner (1938):  Vom Menschen. Versuch einer geisteswissenschaftlichen Anthropologie. Berlin: Duncker & Humblot.
Sombart, Werner (1956):  Noo-Soziologie. Berlin: Duncker & Humblot.
Sombart, Werner (2001):  Economic Life in the Modern Age. Nico Stehr & Reiner Grundmann, eds. New Brunswick: Transaction.  (New English translations of key articles and chapters by Sombart, including (1906) in full and the segment defining Capitalism from (1916))

See also
 WerturteilsstreitNotes

Further reading
Appel, Michael (1992):  Werner Sombart: Historiker und Theoretiker des modernen Kapitalismus. Marburg: Metropolis.
Backhaus, Jürgen G. (1996), ed. Werner Sombart (1863–1941): Social Scientist. 3 vols. Marburg: Metropolis. (The standard, all-encompassing work on Sombart in English.)
Backhaus, Jürgen G. (2000), ed. Werner Sombart (1863–1941): Klassiker der Sozialwissenschaft. Eine kritische Bestandsaufnahme. Marburg: Metropolis.
Brocke, Bernhard vom (1987), ed.:  Sombarts Moderner Kapitalismus. Materialien zur Kritik und Rezeption. München: dtv
Drechsler, W. "Zu Werner Sombarts Theorie der Soziologie und zu seiner Biographie", in Werner Sombart: Klassiker der Sozialwissenschaft. Eine kritische Bestandsaufnahme, Marburg: Metropolis, 2000, pp. 83–100.
 Iannone, Roberta (2013), Umano, ancora umano. Per un'analisi dell'opera Vom Menschen di Werner Sombart, Roma-Acireale, Bonanno.
Lenger, Friedrich (1994):  Werner Sombart, 1863–1941. Eine Biographie. München: Beck.
Mitzman, Arthur (1973) Sociology and Estrangement: Three sociologists of Imperial Germany, New York, Alfred A. Knopf.
Most, Kenneth S. "Sombart, Werner (1863-1941." In History of Accounting: An International Encyclopedia, edited by Michael Chatfield and Richard Vangermeersch. New York: garland Publishing, 1996. pp. 541–542.
Muller, Jerry Z., 2002. The Mind and the Market: Capitalism in Western Thought. Anchor Books.
Nussbaum, Frederick Louis (1933):  A History of the Economic Institutions of Modern Europe: An Introduction of 'Der Moderne Kapitalismus' of Werner Sombart. New York: Crofts.

Sombart, Nicolaus (1991):  Jugend in Berlin, 1933–1943. Ein Bericht. Frankfurt/Main: Fischer.
Sombart, Nicolaus  (1991): Die deutschen Männer und ihre Feinde. Carl Schmitt – ein deutsches Schicksal zwischen Männerbund und Matriachatsmythos.'' Munich: Hanser.

External links

 
 
 
 

1863 births
1941 deaths
Antisemitism in Germany
People from Harz (district)
People from the Province of Saxony
Former Marxists
German anti-communists
German economists
German nationalists
German sociologists
German male non-fiction writers
Historical school economists
Humboldt University of Berlin alumni
Academic staff of the Humboldt University of Berlin
Members of the Prussian Academy of Sciences
German Christians
Right-wing anti-capitalism
German socialists
Conservative Revolutionary movement